{{Infobox boxing match
| fight date = October 1, 1994
| Fight Name = The Final Say
| location = The Scope, Norfolk, Virginia, U.S.
| image = 
| fighter1 = Pernell Whitaker
| nickname1 = Sweet Pea
| purse1 = $2,500,000
| record1 = 33–1–1 (15 KO)
| height1 = 5 ft 6 in
| weight1 = 147 lb
| style1 = Southpaw
| hometown1 = Norfolk, Virginia, U.S.
| recognition1 = WBC welterweight champion[[The Ring (magazine)|The Ring]] No. 1 ranked pound-for-pound fighter3-division world champion
| fighter2 =  James McGirt
| nickname2 = Buddy
| record2 = 64–3–1 (44 KO)
| purse2 = $600,000
| hometown2 = Brentwood, New York, U.S.
| height2 = 5 ft 6+1/2 in
| weight2 = 146 lb
| style2 = Orthodox
| recognition2 =2-division world champion
| titles = WBC welterweight title
| result =  Whitaker wins via 12-round unanimous decision (118–112, 117–112, 117–110)
}}

Pernell Whitaker vs. Buddy McGirt II, billed as The Final Say'', was a professional boxing match contested on October 1, 1994, for Whitaker's WBC welterweight title.

Background
Following a hotly disputed draw with Julio César Chávez, reigning WBC welterweight Pernell Whitaker would then return to his hometown of Norfolk, Virginia to make a successful defense against Santos Cardona, winning by an easy unanimous decision. Following his win over Cardona, Whitaker would next agree to a rematch with James "Buddy" McGirt. Whitaker and McGirt had fought the previous year, with Whitaker scoring a close unanimous decision to capture McGirt's WBC welterweight title. Following the fight, McGirt would undergo surgery for a torn rotator cuff, an injury that had plagued him throughout both the Whitaker fight and his previous title defense against Genaro Léon. Though expected to be out of boxing for a year, McGirt would return 7 months later with a unanimous decision victory over Nick Rupa. McGirt would ultimately go 5–0 after his first loss to Whitaker and insisted on a rematch, calling Whitaker a "punk" and accusing him of ducking him.

The fight
Unlike their close first fight, Whitaker would dominate most of the fight and won by a lopsided unanimous decision. Though Whitaker controlled most of the fight, McGirt would score the only knockdown of the fight, sending Whitaker down on the seat of his pants after landing a right hand. Said Whitaker of the knockdown "It was just a flash knockdown, it caught me off balance, it didn't bother me at all. It made me more aware of what I had to do. I still think I got the round." Knockdown notwithstanding, Whitaker threw a considerable amount of punches more than McGirt, throwing 816 punches of which he landed 330 for a 40% success rate, while McGirt only landed 154 of his 504 thrown punches for a 31% rate. The fight would go the full 12 rounds and all three of the judge's scorecards had Whitaker winning comfortably with scores of 118–112, 117–112 and 117–110.

Fight card

References

1994 in boxing
Boxing matches
1994 in sports in Virginia
Boxing on HBO
Boxing in Virginia
October 1994 sports events in the United States